Michael Williams (born August 27, 1959) is a former American football tight end in the National Football League (NFL) for the Washington Redskins.  He played college football at Alabama A&M University and was drafted in the fifth round of the 1982 NFL Draft.

1959 births
Living people
People from LaFayette, Alabama
American football tight ends
Alabama A&M Bulldogs football players
Washington Redskins players